Optoelectronics (or optronics) is the study and application of electronic devices and systems that find, detect and control light, usually considered a sub-field of photonics.  In this context, light often includes invisible forms of radiation such as gamma rays, X-rays, ultraviolet and infrared, in addition to visible light.  Optoelectronic devices are electrical-to-optical or optical-to-electrical transducers, or instruments that use such devices in their operation.

Electro-optics is often erroneously used as a synonym, but is a wider branch of physics that concerns all interactions between light and electric fields, whether or not they form part of an electronic device.

Optoelectronics is based on the quantum mechanical effects of light on electronic materials, especially semiconductors, sometimes in the presence of electric fields.
 Photoelectric or photovoltaic effect, used in:
 photodiodes (including solar cells)
 phototransistors
 photomultipliers
 optoisolators
 integrated optical circuit (IOC) elements
 Photoconductivity, used in:
 photoresistors
 photoconductive camera tubes
 charge-coupled imaging devices
 Stimulated emission, used in:
 injection laser diodes
 quantum cascade lasers
 Lossev effect, or radiative recombination, used in:
 light-emitting diodes or LED
 OLEDs
 Photoemissivity, used in
 photoemissive camera tube

Important applications of optoelectronics include:
 Optocoupler
 Optical fiber communications

See also 

 Interconnect bottleneck
 Liquid-crystal display
 Non-radiative lifetime
 OECC (OptoElectronics and Communications Conference)
 Optical amplifier
 Optical communication
 Optical fiber
 Optical interconnect
 Opto-electronic oscillator
 Parallel optical interface
 Photoemission
 Photoemission spectroscopy
 Photovoltaic effect
 Stimulated emission
 Electronics

References

External links 
 
 OIDA (Optoelectronics Industry Development Association)